Ivan Evstratiev Geshov (20 February 1849 [8 February 1849 OS] – 11 March 1924) was a Bulgarian politician who served as Bulgarian Prime Minister.

He was born in Plovdiv to a family of merchants originally from Karlovo. Geshov was educated at the Bulgarian Sts. Cyrill and Methodius High School in Plovdiv, as well as at Owens College in Manchester (1866-1869), where he studied logic and political economy under William Stanley Jevons. Geshov first came to political attention through his involvement in the campaign for Bulgarian independence from the Ottoman Empire. He wrote a series of letters against the Ottomans and was sentenced to death, although this was later commuted to exile in Aleppo. He was pardoned in 1878 after independence was gained and returned to Bulgaria to become involved in the government of Eastern Rumelia, taking on a number of roles including Minister of Finance for the region.

As governor of the Bulgarian National Bank from 1883 onwards he became recognized as one of the country's leading economic minds and was eventually appointed Finance Minister in the government of Vasil Radoslavov in 1886. In this role, and subsequent spells as Finance Minister, he tended to follow protectionism in order to build up Bulgaria's fairly backward economy. However he was opposed to the policies of Stefan Stambolov, at the time one of the country's regents, and resigned in 1887, largely over the pro-Austria-Hungary stance of Stambolov.

After a break from political life, he returned as Finance Minister in the government of Konstantin Stoilov in 1894, a position he held for three years. In 1901 he became President of the Sabranie (Assembly) and that same year was elected leader of the People's Party, following the death of Stoilov. In 1908, he took part in the so called "Geshoff incident".

Geshov finally formed a government on 29 March 1911, heading a moderate coalition of nationalists and Stoyan Danev's Russophile faction. As Prime Minister he supported the introduction of the proportional representation electoral system.  He also supported the policy of working through the Balkan League and led the country through the First Balkan War against Ottoman Empire. However, he resigned on 30 May 1913, the day that the Treaty of London was signed to end the War, as he opposed the Tsar's policy of making war on the Balkan League allies. Despite this, it had been Geshov's government that gave the Tsar the power to sign treaties in the first place.

Geshov remained in politics as a member of the parliament, joining the Democratic Party in 1923 after the fall of the government of Aleksandar Stamboliyski, but he played no further roles in government.

Outside politics he fulfilled a number of roles, including editor of the Maritsa newspaper, founder of the Study Society and the Scientific and Literary Society and chairman of the Bulgarian Red Cross (1899-1924) and the Bulgarian Academy of Sciences (1911-1924).

References

External links
 
 
 
 

 
 

1849 births
1924 deaths
Politicians from Plovdiv
People's Party (Bulgaria) politicians
Prime Ministers of Bulgaria
Foreign ministers of Bulgaria
Finance ministers of Bulgaria
Members of the National Assembly (Bulgaria)
Members of the Bulgarian Academy of Sciences
Governors of the Bulgarian National Bank
Bulgarian expatriates in the United Kingdom
Bulgarian people of the Balkan Wars
Recipients of Bulgarian royal pardons